Pepsi True (stylized as pepsi TRUE) is a cola-flavored carbonated soft drink. It is a variant of the Pepsi cola range and is sweetened with sugar and stevia.  Pepsi True launched in the United States on October 12, 2014, as PepsiCo's answer to Coca-Cola Life. It was sold in green cans and in glass bottles with green labels.

See also
 Pepsi Next

References

External links
 Pepsi Official Website

PepsiCo cola brands
Products introduced in 2014
Discontinued soft drinks
Products and services discontinued in 2018